The brothers Heinrich and Julius Hart were German writers and literary critics who collaborated closely. They were among the pioneers of naturalism in German literature.

Heinrich was born 30 December 1855, in Wesel and died 11 June 1906, in Tecklenburg. Julius was born 9 April 1859, in Münster and died 7 July 1930, in Berlin.

The Hart brothers published works of literary criticism, notably Kritische Waffengänge (parts 1–6, 1882–1884), in which they opposed the light reading chosen by the bourgeoisie.

Works

Hart, J. Sansara (1879)
Hart, J. The Triumph of Life (1898)
Hart, H. Gesammelte Werke, vols. 1–4. Berlin (1907)
Hart, J. Revolution der Ästhetik. Berlin (1908)
Hart, H. Song of Humanity, an attempt to depict the panorama of man's development from ancient times. He finished only three "songs":
"Tul and Nahila" (1888)
"Nimrod" (1888)
"Moses" (1896)

References

 Hart, Heinrich and Julius at the Great Soviet Encyclopedia. Accessed April 1013
 Jürgen, I. Der Theaterkritiker Julius Hart. Berlin, 1956. (Dissertation.)
 
 Secondary literature on Heinrich and Julius Hart 
 List of works by the Hart brothers
 Modern poet-characters in Zeno.org

1855 births
1859 births
1906 deaths
1930 deaths
German literary critics
Sibling duos
German male non-fiction writers